The SS Barossa was a 4,239-gross register ton cargo ship built by Caledon Shipbuilding & Engineering Company, Dundee for the Adelaide Steamship Company in 1938. She was heavily damaged and sank as a result of damage suffered during the Japanese air raid on Darwin on 19 February 1942. She was salvaged and refloated. Barossa was transferred to Associated Steamships in January 1964, before being sold in May and renamed Cronulla.

Fate
Cronulla was damaged in a typhoon. She was declared a total wreck and was scrapped in 1969 at Hong Kong.

Notes

1938 ships
Ships sunk in the bombing of Darwin, 1942
Merchant ships sunk by aircraft
Adelaide Steamship Company